Mawlamyine District is a district of the Mon State in Myanmar. The capital is Mawlamyine town. The district covers an area of 6,084 km2, and had a population of 1,232,221 at the 2014 Census.

Townships
The district contains the following townships:

Mawlamyine Township 
Kyaikmaraw Township 
Chaungzon Township
Thanbyuzayat Township 
Mudon Township 
Ye Township

References

Districts of Myanmar
Mon State